Mohd Saufi Ibrahim (born 27 January 1983) is a Malaysian football player currently playing for Kuala Lumpur FA, a team playing in the Malaysian Premier League. He formerly played with Betaria FC, Penang FA , Terengganu FA , DRB-Hicom F.C. and PDRM FA.

Honours

Club

PDRM FA
Malaysia Premier League: 2014

External links
 
 Mohd Saufi Ibrahim at ifball.com
 Article: Mohd Saufi Ibrahim at ganusoccer.net 

Malaysian footballers
Penang F.C. players
People from Penang
1983 births
Living people
Malaysian people of Malay descent
Footballers at the 2006 Asian Games
Sportspeople from Penang
Association football forwards
Asian Games competitors for Malaysia